Luellyn Harper Thomas is an American costume designer. She won an Primetime Emmy Award and was nominated for one more in the category Outstanding Costumes, for her work on the television program, NewsRadio. Harper was the only person to win an Primetime Emmy Award for NewsRadio.

References

External links 

American costume designers
Women costume designers
Living people
Year of birth missing (living people)
Primetime Emmy Award winners
Place of birth missing (living people)